Jamal Uddin Ahmed may refer to:
 Jamal Uddin Ahmed (Bangladesh Air Force officer) (born 1943)
 Jamal Uddin Ahmed (politician) (1954–2021), Indian politician
 Jamal Uddin Ahmed (artist) (born 1955), Bangladeshi artist